Tosale oviplagalis, the dimorphic tosale moth,  is a moth of the family Pyralidae.

Geography 
It is found from eastern North America (from New York to Florida and west to Illinois and Texas) south to Colombia and Peru.

Reproduction 
Adults are sexually dimorphic.

Description 
Males are brownish and have elongated scales at the tip of the abdomen. Females have a similar pattern, but in shades of gray. Adults are on wing from May to September.

References

Moths described in 1866
Chrysauginae